Lebak Regency is a regency of Banten province, Indonesia. It is located on the island of Java. The regency has an area of 3,305.072 km2 and had a population of 1,204,095 at the 2010 census and 1,386,793 at the 2020 census; the official estimate as at mid 2022 was 1,433,853. The town of Rangkasbitung in the north of the regency is the administrative centre. The regency is bordered by Pandeglang Regency to the west, Serang Regency to the north, and Tangerang Regency to the north-east, and by Bogor Regency and Sukabumi Regency of West Java Province to the east.

History 
The Lebak Regency is the regency to which the Dutchman Eduard Douwes Dekker, better known by his pseudonym (Multatuli), was appointed in 1856 as Assistant Resident. Douwes Dekker observed that the local regent exploited the local population and requested his removal. He made a few mistakes in this. He bypassed his direct chief and overlooked the size of abuse by the regent. The regent being of local nobility but paid the colonial government was regularly in poor circumstances having to keep up with demands of patronage for his large family, according to the adat, the traditional law.
Bad practices were known and condoned to a certain extent by the colonial administration. Governmental research that same year showed however more serious abuse by the lesser local officials. The governor-general disapproved of Dekker's tactless conduct and ordered his replacement, which Dekker refused. He resigned after three months of duty in Lebak. Home he published four years later 'Max Havelaar, or the Coffee Auctions of the Dutch Trading Company', a pamphlet-novel, which had great influence on later administrators, less by force of analysis than by the vigour of its language, setting a new standard for Dutch literature.

Administrative districts 
The regency is divided into 28 districts (kecamatan), tabulated below with their areas and populations from the 2010 census and the 2020 census; together with the official estimates as at mid 2021. The table also includes the location of the district administrative centres, the number of administrative villages (rural desa and urban kelurahan) in each district, and its postal codes.

Notes: (a) including 5 small offshore islands.

Tourism
To the southern coast of the regency, there are Sawarna Beach and Ciantir Beach which can be accessed from Jakarta by a 6 hours drive. The modest Sawarna village has no available 24 hours electricity and no television broadcast can be accessed. In some areas, terraced rice fields are like in Ubud, Bali. Ciantir Beach is suitable for professional surfers with the high tides of the Indian Ocean.

Since 2018, the regency has operated a history museum in Rangkasbitung, the Multatuli Museum, which focuses on the anti-colonial struggle and the Dutch author Multatuli.

References

Rob Nieuwenhuys, Oost-Indische Spiegel, Amsterdam, 1978.
Rob Nieuwenhuys, De mythe van Lebak, Amsterdam,1987.

External links